Chanava (earlier Hanava, Hanva) is a village and municipality in the Rimavská Sobota District of the Banská Bystrica Region of southern Slovakia.

History
In historical records, the village was first mentioned in 1266 as Honua (1295 Hanua) as property of a monastery. In the 15th century it was the seat of the local noble family "Hanva", since the mid-16th century the "Hanvay", later on the "Darvasy" etc.

Genealogical resources

The records for genealogical research are available at the state archive "Statny Archiv in Banska Bystrica,

Slovakia"

 Roman Catholic church records (births/marriages/deaths): 1789-1896 (parish B)
 Reformated church records (births/marriages/deaths): 1740-1896 (parish A)

See also
 List of municipalities and towns in Slovakia

External links
https://web.archive.org/web/20071116010355/http://www.statistics.sk/mosmis/eng/run.html
http://www.chanava.ou.sk/
http://www.chanava.gemer.org/
Surnames of living people in Chanava

Villages and municipalities in Rimavská Sobota District
Hungarian communities in Slovakia